Bryan Watson (born 18 April 1969) was nine times Professional World Latin Dance Champion and won the International Latin American Championship five times.

Watson was born in Durban, South Africa. He became the UK Open Amateur champion with Claudia Leonie in 1991 and the runner-up in the International Latin Professional World Championships with Karen Hardy in 1996. He then won his first International Latin Professional World Championships with Carmen Vincelj in 1999. Watson and Vincelj proceeded to win every major International Latin Professional Championships that they entered until their retirement from competition in 2007. The couple continue to run a dance teaching studio in Wimbledon, London and gave an interesting interview on the subject of retiring from competition.

Career

World championships 
Bryan Watson and Carmen Vincelj won the World Dance Council's World Professional Latin Championship for nine years running, from 1999–2007.

International Latin American Championship 
Watson won the Professional Latin American title at the International Championships at the Albert Hall, London, five times. These are the oldest recognised Latin championships in ballroom dance.
 1998 with Karen Hardy as partner.
 2000, 2001, 2003, 2004 with Carmen Vincelj as partner.

Other international titles 
Watson also won the British Open Latin Championship seven times (details not to hand.)

 2005 Blackpool Professional Latin 1st
 2005 WDC European Professional Latin 2005 Russia 1st
 2005 German Professional Latin 2005 Germany 1st
 2004 Moscow Kremlin Cup 2004 Latin 1st
 2004 British Professional Latin 1st
 2004 Professional Latin Cup 2004. Germany 1st
 2004 German Professional Latin 2004 Germany 1st
 2004 WDC German Masters Latin 2004. Germany 1st
 2003 WDC World Masters 2003 Professional LA Austria 1st
 2003 GP von Deutschland (Grand Prix) Closed Professional LA 1st
 2003 WDC US Open Professional LA USA 1st
 2003 WDC German Open GOC 2003 Professional LA	Germany	1st
 International Latin American Dance Champions
 World Latin Dance Champions

References 

1969 births
Living people
People from Durban
South African ballroom dancers